The Armenian millet was the Ottoman millet (autonomous ethnoreligious community) of the Armenian Apostolic Church. It initially included not just Armenians in the Ottoman Empire but members of other Christian churches including the Coptic Church, Chaldean Catholic Church, Ethiopian Orthodox Tewahedo Church, and Syriac Orthodox Church, although most of these groups obtained their own millet in the nineteenth century. Mehmet II separated them from the Greek Orthodox because of the disagreements that they had over orthodoxy.  The members of the millet were not only able to handle things autonomously, they had the legal status to bring a case to the Islamic courts. The Armenian millet did not have the ability to hold authority over the many people they were supposed to, and the Armenian patriarch's power had no real authority in Istanbul being so far from Anatolia.

See also 
 Rum millet

References

Sources

Further reading 
 
 
 

Armenian Apostolic Church
Armenians from the Ottoman Empire
History of the Ottoman Empire
Christianity in the Ottoman Empire